Williamia is a genus of small sea snails or false limpets, marine pulmonate gastropod molluscs in the family Siphonariidae, the false (air-breathing) limpets.

Their development is similar to other Siphonariids.

Species
Species within the genus Williamia include:
 Williamia eximia (Nevill in G. & H. Nevill, 1869)
 Williamia gussoni Costa, 1829
 Williamia krebsii (Mörch, 1877)
 Williamia magellanica Dall, 1927
 Williamia peltoides (Carpenter, 1864) - shield false limpet
 Williamia radiata (Pease, 1860)
 Williamia radiata nutata Headley, 1908
 Williamia subspiralis (Carpenter, 1864)

Species brought into synonymy:
 Williamia galapagana Dall : synonym of Williamia peltoides (Carpenter, 1864)
 Williamia gussonii (O. G. Costa, 1829): synonym of Williamia gussoni (Costa O. G., 1829)
 Williamia japonica Habe, 1962: synonym of Williamia radiata (Pease, 1860)
 Williamia kermadecensis (Iredale, 1912): synonym of Williamia radiata (Pease, 1860)
 Williamia nutata (Headley, 1908): synonym of Williamia radiata nutata (Headley, 1908)
 Williamia oblongata (Yokoyama, 1926): synonym of Siphonacmea oblongata (Yokoyama, 1926)
 Williamia polynesica Rehder, 1980: synonym of Williamia radiata (Pease, 1860)
 Williamia radiata Kuroda & Habe, in Habe, 1961: synonym of Williamia radiata (Pease, 1860)
 Williamia tomlini (Robson, 1913): synonym of Aporemodon tomlini Robson, 1913

References

 
 Discover Life
 Marshall B.A. (1981) The genus Williamia in the western Pacific (Mollusca: Siphonariidae). New Zealand Journal of Zoology 8: 487-492

Siphonariidae